Roger Charles Reed  is a Professor of Engineering Science and Materials at the University of Oxford. He works at Oxford's Begbroke Science Park, and is associated with its Departments of Engineering Science and Materials. He is a Fellow at St. Anne's College, Oxford.

Education 
Reed was educated at the University of Cambridge, where he was awarded a PhD in 1990 for research on multipass steel.

Career and research
Reed has held academic positions at Imperial College London, the University of Cambridge, the University of British Columbia (UBC), where he held a Canada Research Chair.  During the period 2006 to 2012 he worked in the Dept of Metallurgy and Materials at the University of Birmingham, where he acted as Director of Research. He moved to Oxford in 2013. He holds a visiting position at the Max Planck Institute for Iron Research.

In 2017, Reed and his collaborators founded the University spin-off company OxMet Technologies Ltd  to commercialise some aspects of his research group’s efforts at the University of Oxford.

Reed's research is focused on high temperature materials and nickel-based superalloys for use in jet engines and for generating power. Reed has also researched deformation mechanisms in single crystal superalloys under various mechanical fatigue conditions; phase transitions and oxidation reactions; as well as quantitatively studying process modelling for welding and forging. His book The Superalloys: Fundamentals and Applications was published in 2006.

Awards and honours
Reed was elected a Fellow of the Institute of Materials in 2005, a Fellow of ASM International in 2001, and Fellow of the Royal Academy of Engineering (FREng) in 2017.

References

Living people
Fellows of St Anne's College, Oxford
British materials scientists
British metallurgists
Canada Research Chairs
1965 births
Fellows of the Institute of Materials, Minerals and Mining
Fellows of the Royal Academy of Engineering